Roth is a Landkreis (district) in Middle Franconia, Bavaria, Germany. It is bounded by (from the northeast and clockwise) the districts of Nürnberger Land, Neumarkt, Eichstätt, Weißenburg-Gunzenhausen, Ansbach and Fürth, and the cities of Schwabach and Nürnberg.

In medieval times the area was ruled by many lords. Brandenburg-Ansbach and Nuremberg owned possessions in the territory, and other parts were the property of clerical states. When these clerical states were dissolved in 1803, the territory fell to Bavaria.

The district was established in 1972 through the merger of the former districts of Roth, Schwabach and Hilpoltstein.

Coat of arms

Towns and municipalities

References

External links

 Official website (German)

 
Districts of Bavaria